Manuel Buenacasa (1886–1964) was a Spanish militant anarchist, secretary general and chronicler of the Confederación Nacional del Trabajo (CNT) and Federación Anarquista Ibérica (FAI) labor unions.

Career 

Buenacasa was born on July 7, 1886, in the Spanish town of Caspe, where he started school. He trained for priesthood in a Franciscan seminary in Villanueva del Aceral, but left as a late teen to become a carpenter in his home province. He kept this trade for the remainder of his life.

Buenacasa joined the province's carpenter union in 1906 and quickly became its president. He came to edit a regional anarchist newspaper, Cultura y Acción, in 1910. Following a violent strike, he went into exile. In England, Buenacasa met Errico Malatesta. Upon receiving government clemency, Buenacasa returned to Spain in 1913. During his time in Barcelona, between 1914 and 1921, he was jailed and exiled multiple times. He became a member of the Confederación Nacional del Trabajo (CNT) labor union in 1914, and joined its national committee four years later. Buenacasa organized the CNT's December 1919 congress in Madrid. He advocated for a Third International, though he would later regret this. In 1921, he returned to Zaragoza to edit Cultura y Acción. The next year, he became secretary of the region's CNT.

From 1923 to 1930, the years of the Miguel Primo de Rivera dictatorship, Buenacasa went into exile multiple times. He came to edit the Catalonian anarchist newspaper El Productor in 1925. Buenacasa joined in the founding of the militant Federación Anarquista Ibérica (FAI) in July 2017 and moderated between the CNT and FAI in the coming years, having been a major contributor to the growth of both. He chronicled this time in the 1933 book, La CNT, los Treinta y la FAI. He had earlier written the 1928 history, El Movimiento Obrero Español (1886-1926). Historia y Crítica, or The Spanish Workers Movement (1886–1926): History and Criticism, which was later reissued in Paris in 1966. Buenacasa's writings are among the foremost sources on internal CNT and FAI operations.

He led a school during the Spanish Civil War and afterwards, he was held in a French concentration camp. Buenacasa worked to reorganize the CNT in exile. He died in Bourg-lès-Valence, France, on November 6, 1964. Though he remained a lifelong militant anarchist, Buenacasa opposed the terrorist actions in the name of anarchism.

Personal life 

Buenacasa was married in 1910 and had one son.

References

Bibliography 

 
 
 
 Kern, R. W. Red Years, Black Years. 1978.

1886 births
1964 deaths
Carpenters
Confederación Nacional del Trabajo members
Historians of anarchism
Historians of Spain
Labor historians
People from Bajo Aragón-Caspe
Spanish anarchists
Spanish expatriates in France